Martin Hyland (1 September 1969 – 12 December 2006) was a major Irish criminal and gang boss.

Early life

Martin Hyland was born to a working-class family from Saint Attracta Road in Cabra, Dublin. As a teenager he led a gang of young criminals from Cabra, involved in burglary, car theft and robbery. In 1986, eighteen-year-old Hyland was sent to prison for various offences including conspiracy to commit robbery, burglary, malicious damage and car theft.

Rise to prominence

After his release from serving a short prison sentence in the early 1990s, Hyland became involved in drug dealing. He moved into the big league of crime when he became associated with P.J. Judge, a major drugs trafficker and gang leader from Finglas.

P.J. Judge was shot dead outside the Royal Oak pub in Finglas in December 1996. Gardaí suspect he was killed by Provisional IRA because of his erratic and violent nature. Within a few years of Judge's death, Hyland had become the dominant figure in organised crime in North Dublin. He controlled a large gang of drug dealers and armed robbers from Cabra, Finglas and Ballymun. The gang were involved in the importation of large shipments of cannabis, cocaine, ecstasy and heroin as well as VAT fraud, car theft, armed robbery, extortion and the supply of firearms. Between 2002 and 2004 his gang was involved in a spate of robberies of security vans delivering money to ATM bank machines in Dublin. In a ten-month period alone, between October 2003 to July 2004, they got away with an estimated €3 million.

Hyland also had links with other major criminal gangs in Dublin and supplied guns to one of the factions involved in the Crumlin-Drimnagh feud. He also supplied guns to the notorious McCarthy-Dundon gang who are heavily involved in the Limerick feud.

Downfall

All the criminal activity meant that Hyland and his associates became prime targets of the Gardai. In September 2005, Gardaí decided to adapt a full on multi agency tactical approach to stop his gang. The plan, involving Gardaí and customs, was codenamed Operation Oak.
The operation was a huge success and within the first few months it had led to the seizure of 30 kilos of heroin, 35 kilos of cocaine and 1,427 kilos of cannabis. A number of stolen vehicles, €200,000 in cash and weapons including AK47s were also recovered. Twenty six of Hyland's associates were also facing serious charges, which led to resentment and bad feeling within the gang. As Gardaí pressure increased Hyland became more isolated as gang members blamed him for all the attention. In November 2006 and again on 7 December, Hyland was warned by Gardaí, as is protocol, that his life was in danger.

Death

On the night of 11 December 2006, Hyland, who had access to several properties and never stayed at the same place two nights in a row, stayed at the home of his niece in Scribblestown Park, Finglas. Just before 9am the next morning, after his niece had left to take her daughter to school, two gunmen entered the house. Hyland was sleeping in a bedroom upstairs while 20-year-old Anthony Campbell, an apprentice plumber who had called to the house earlier to work on a faulty radiator, was downstairs. One of the gunmen held Anthony Campbell downstairs while the other crept up the stairs and shot Hyland twice in the head and four times in the back as he slept. Before they left they also shot the innocent Campbell once in the head, killing him instantly. Despite Gardaí suspecting the killers were two of Hyland's most trusted lieutenants, no one has been convicted of the double murder. Eamon Dunne, who drove the getaway car for Hyland's killers, effectively took control of the gang soon after. Dunne was linked to over a dozen gangland murders over the next three years before he himself was shot dead at a pub in Cabra in April 2010.

References

Further reading
Williiams, Paul. "Crime Wars". Merlin Publishing, 2008. 
Williams, Paul. "Badfellas". Penguin Ireland, 2011. 

Irish drug traffickers
Irish murder victims
Irish crime bosses
Deaths by firearm in the Republic of Ireland
People murdered in the Republic of Ireland
1969 births
2006 deaths
Unsolved murders in Ireland
Criminals from Dublin (city)
2006 murders in the Republic of Ireland